Gierymski, feminine: Gierymska is a  Polish-language surname. Notable people with this surname include

Aleksander Gierymski (1850-1901), Polish painter
Maksymilian Gierymski (1846-1874), Polish painter
, Polish poet

Polish-language surnames
pl:Gierymski